Marnie Woodrow (born 1969) is a Canadian comedian and writer and editor. She has also worked as an editor, magazine writer and as a researcher for TV and radio.

Woodrow has published two short fiction collections, Why We Close Our Eyes When We Kiss in 1991 and In the Spice House in 1996, before publishing her debut novel Spelling Mississippi in 2002. Spelling Mississippi was shortlisted for the Amazon.ca First Novel Award in 2003.

Woodrow was mentored in her early writing career by the late Timothy Findley. She has also been a columnist for Xtra!, Toronto's gay and lesbian biweekly newspaper. Her occasional journalism, essays, stories and poetry have appeared in numerous publications including The Globe and Mail, National Post, CV2, Write, NOW, eye weekly and This Magazine.

A former resident of Toronto, she now resides in Barrie, where she writes and performs her thrice-weekly YouTube comedy show, Happyesque with Merna Wolf. A former writing instructor at the University of Toronto School of Continuing Studies, she continues to mentor aspiring writers of all ages.

Her second novel, Heyday, was published in 2015 by Tightrope Books and won the Hamilton Arts Council Fiction prize as well as a Golden Crown Literary Award; it was also short-listed for the Toronto Book Award.

References

1969 births
Living people
Canadian women non-fiction writers
Canadian women comedians
Canadian women novelists
Canadian columnists
People from Orillia
Academic staff of the University of Toronto
Canadian women journalists
Canadian LGBT novelists
Canadian women short story writers
Canadian women columnists
Comedians from Toronto
Journalists from Toronto
Writers from Toronto
Writers from Hamilton, Ontario
20th-century Canadian short story writers
21st-century Canadian novelists
21st-century Canadian women writers
20th-century Canadian women writers
21st-century Canadian short story writers
21st-century Canadian LGBT people
20th-century Canadian LGBT people